George Trenholm Allen (July 27, 1914 – March 27, 2000) was a Canadian professional ice hockey player who played Left Wing in the National Hockey League, mostly for the Chicago Black Hawks, between 1938 and 1947. Allen was born in Bayfield, New Brunswick, but grew up in Kerrobert, Saskatchewan.

Playing career
Allen began his career playing in various locations in the east, until he joined the North Battleford Beavers of the Northern Saskatchewan Senior Hockey League, with whom he went to the Allan Cup final in 1937, where they lost to the Sudbury Tigers. After playing four games with the Tigers himself the following year, Allen was then signed by the New York Rangers, and assigned to their New Haven Eagles farm team.  Injuries to the Rangers forced them to call up Allen during the 1938–39 season, taking Lynn Patrick's place in the lineup, and  he earned 12 points in 19 games. In his debut with the Rangers, he scored 3 points (two goals and an assist), setting a Rangers' mark for most points in his first game (later matched by Dominic Moore in 2003).  After the season, his rights were then sold to the Black Hawks, on May 17, 1939.

With the Black Hawks Allen became a regular everyday player, and was fifth in team scoring in his first season. His best season ranking-wise with Chicago was 1940-41, when he ranked second, and third in the playoffs. Allen's best season production-wise was 1943-44, when he scored 41 points, good for fifth on the team, and was third in playoff scoring, as Montreal swept Chicago in the Stanley Cup final.  Allen missed the 1944–45 NHL season due to the National War Labour Board restrictions on crossing the Canada–US border.  He played one more year in Chicago, and ahead of the 1946-47 NHL season Allen was traded to the Montreal Canadiens, for Paul Bibeault, with both teams holding "right of recall".   After the season, the players were returned to their original teams, but after a couple of seasons in the minors, Allen never played in the NHL again.  Allen went on to spend one season as a playing-coach during the 1950–51 season with the Regina Capitals.

Allen's brother Viv  played 6 games for the New York Americans in 1940, but as the Americans did not play Chicago in that span, the two brothers never had the chance to play against each other in the NHL.  After their hockey careers, the two brothers went into farming together.

Career statistics

Regular season and playoffs

Coaching statistics

References

External links

1914 births
2000 deaths
Buffalo Bisons (AHL) players
Canadian ice hockey coaches
Canadian ice hockey left wingers
Chicago Blackhawks players
Cleveland Barons (1937–1973) players
Ice hockey people from Saskatchewan
Minneapolis Millers (AHA) players
Montreal Canadiens players
New Haven Eagles players
New York Rangers players
Philadelphia Ramblers players